Maksim Kedrin (born 21 September 1982 in Beloretsk) is a Russian former alpine skier who competed in the 2002 Winter Olympics.

External links
 sports-reference.com
 

1982 births
Living people
People from Beloretsk
Russian male alpine skiers
Olympic alpine skiers of Russia
Alpine skiers at the 2002 Winter Olympics
Sportspeople from Bashkortostan